Teutschenthal is a municipality in the Saalekreis district, Saxony-Anhalt, Germany. In January 2005 it absorbed the former municipalities Holleben and Zscherben, in January 2010 Dornstedt, Langenbogen and Steuden and in September 2010 Angersdorf.

References

Saalekreis